"L'autre moi" is the debut studio album by French singer Carla Lazzari, released on 5 June 2020, featuring her Junior Eurovision Song Contest 2019 entry, "Bim bam toi". The album contained 13 tracks.

Background and promotion 
L'autre moi was first announced by the artist on Instagram on 6 May 2020, stating that she would show her audience "her other self".

Singles 
"Bim bam toi" was released as the lead single, and the artists debut single, to the then-unannounced album on 11 October 2019 to represent France in the Junior Eurovision Song Contest 2019. It is an electropop track, performed in French. It was written by Barbara Pravi and Igit, and produced by Julien Comblat. The lyrics tells the story of love at first sight. The single premiered alongside a music video, which, since February 2020, is currently the most-viewed Junior Eurovision-related video on YouTube. At Junior Eurovision, the song performed second in the running order, and finished in fifth place with a total of 169 points.

"L'autre moi", the title track, was released as the second single of the album. The single was announced at the same time as the album. It is a pop track, written by Benjamin Samama and Jérémy Chapron, who also produced the track. The lyrics are about being herself, and not listening to what other people say. The music video to the track was released several weeks later, on 25 June 2020.

"Cœur sur toi", was released as the third single of the album, and the first single of the "Réédition" version of the album. It was released on 4 November 2020, followed by a music video on 9 December 2020. The lyrics are about not being afraid to be in love with someone.

Réédition version 
On 4 December 2020, the "Réédition" version of the album was released, containing 6 new tracks, one of which, Noël blanc being a French language cover of White Christmas by Irving Berlin.

Track listing

Charts

Release history

References

Pop albums by French artists
MCA Records albums
2020 debut albums